A trumpeter's wart is a  cutaneous  condition characterized by a firm, fibrous, hyperkeratotic nodule on the upper lip of a trumpet player.

References 

Conditions of the mucous membranes